Heath Freeman may refer to:

 Heath Freeman (actor) (1980–2021), American actor
 Heath Freeman (businessman) (born  1979), American businessman